List of original audiobooks, gamebooks, parodies, photo comics, and picture books based on Star Trek and its spin-offs, as well as fictional references, manuals, and biographies written from an in-universe perspective, and other tie-in fiction works.

Tie-in fiction works have been published by Simon & Schuster, Titan Books, and by souvenir book publisher Insight Editions. Other publishers include Random House, St. Martin's Press, Running Press, and Cedar Mill.

Random House (1975–present) 

Penguin Random House and its imprints, such as Ballantine, Bantam, have published tie-in works based on Star Trek since 1975. Random House also distributes titles published by DK and Titan to the U.S., as well as select titles from smaller publishers. Hero Collector, an imprint of Eagle Moss, is also distributed to booksellers by Random House.

Star Fleet manuals (1975–1977) 

The Star Fleet manuals were fan-produced, self-published works, later reprinted by Ballantine Books. The self-published editions did not include any uses of the Star Trek name. Joseph's Technical Manual served as the basis for the Star Fleet Universe series of games published by Task Force.

Star Trek Pop Up (1977) 

Four-page children's pop-up books published by Random House Merchandising. The books were printed and assembled in Brazil.

Star Trek Fotonovel (1977–78) 

Star Trek Fotonovel series is a twelve-volume photo comic adaptation of popular Star Trek episodes. The comics were produced by Mandala Productions for Bantam Books. Each volume includes full-color, photographic stills taken from the film master of each episode with comics-style speech and scene bubbles. Mandala Productions promoted each volume as an "accurate and faithful recreation" of each episode. The series was cancelled due to poor sales.

Official Cooking Manual (1978) 
Official Star Trek Cooking Manual (1978) compiled recipes for foods and drinks referenced in episodes of the Original Series. The framing device is the manual, a document from Christine Chapel personal database, is transmitted into the past, which was then edited for print by Mary Ann Piccard. Published by Bantam Books.

Star Trek Maps (1980) 

Star Trek Maps (1980) is a box set of color maps and an instructional booklet demonstrating the stellar cartography and navigation system as seen on episodes of Star Trek live-action and animated series, and Star Trek: The Motion Picture. Designed by Jeffrey Maynard, with contributions from Rick Sternbach, and Geoffrey Mandel, who would design Star Charts in 2003. Larry Nemecek made uncredited contributions. Nemecek expanded on the design language developed for Star Trek Maps in Star Charts (2003), and Stellar Cartography (2013).

DK (2013–present) 
References published by DK.

Little Golden Books (2019–2020) 

Children's picture books published as part of the long-running Little Golden Books series. Illustrated by Ethen Beavers.

BenBella (2021–2022) 
Books by boutique publisher BenBella Books.

Simon & Schuster (1979–present) 

Pocket Books, an imprint of Simon & Schuster's, has published licensed tie-ins and other works for Star Trek since 1979. Other Simon & Schuster imprints, including Wanderer, Archway, Simon & Schuster For Boys, and Simon & Schuster Audioworks, also published tie-in fiction works.

Film tie-ins for children (1980–1996) 

Children's tie-ins based on the film series. Published by various imprints of Simon & Schuster, including Wanderer, Just for Boys, and Archway.

Film photo comics (1980–1982) 

Photo comic adaptations edited by Richard J. Anibole, and published by Pocket Books. The Motion Picture photo comic contains full-color photographic reproductions of scenes, with comics-style speech and action bubbles. The Wrath of Khan adaptation contains black and white stills, with plain text descriptions.

Which Way Books (1984–1986) 
The Which Way Books gamebook series includes two volumes based on Star Trek. Published by Archway.

Klingon language instruction 
Klingon language instruction written by Marc Okrand.

Star Trek Chronology (1993–1996) 

Star Trek Chronology (1993) is a chronological reference of events depicted in Star Trek and The Next Generation. The chronology was commissioned by Gene Roddenberry in 1987 with the expectation the result would be "7–10 pages of dates." A new edition was published in 1996.

Original audio dramas 
Presentations which include an original score and a cast of three or more voices.

Star Trek Cookbook (1999–2022) 

The Star Trek Cookbook (1999) was presented as a cookbook co-written by Voyager chef, Neelix. A new edition which will "reimagine … favorite foods from across Star Trek" is scheduled for 2022.

Hero Collector (2018–2021) 

Licensed works published by Hero Collector. Distributed to booksellers by Penguin Random House.

Shipyards (2018–2022) 

Star Trek Shipyards, also known as The Encyclopedia of Star Trek Ships, is an illustrated reference series which collects and expands on material originally created for the Star Trek: The Official Starships Collection.

Designing Starships (2018–19) 

Star Trek Designing Starships is an illustrated reference series offering a mixture of non-fiction and in-universe material concerning the design and function of the featured starships.

Illustrated handbooks (2019–21) 
Illustrated references collecting and updating selections from Star Trek Fact Files, as well as new material. Similar to other illustrated reference works, the contents are a mix of in-universe and non-fiction prose. The series is a spin-off of the Star Trek: The Official Starships Collection.

Other works 
Below is an incomplete list of notable tie-in works:

Klingon Hamlet (1996–2000) 

Hamlet, Prince of Denmark: The Restored Klingon Version (1996) is a Klingon language reference translation of William Shakespeare's Hamlet. Also known as The Tragedy of Khamlet, Son of the Emperor of Qo'noS. Published as a limited edition by the Klingon Language Institute in 1996. Published as The Klingon Hamlet by Pocket Books in 2000.

Federation: The First 150 Years (2012–13) 
Star Trek: Federation: The First 150 Years (2012) is a limited edition fictional reference written by David A. Goodman. Editions from 47North and becker&mayer! included an audio introduction by George Takei, and a custom display case. Titan Books published a reprint in 2013 which included some formatting and text changes.

New Visions (2013–2019) 

Star Trek: New Visions is a photo comic series which utilized imagery from episodes of Star Trek to create new stories. The images were stitched together using modern photo editing and special effects software. Each completed frame is original to the comics, and characters, settings, and action, designed to appear seamless, regardless of the image's source. All issues were composed by John Byrne, and published by IDW Publishing. Collections were published in trade paperback format from 2014 to 2019. Issues 1 and 2 were assigned an ISBN.

Special issues (2013–2016) 
Star Trek Annual 2013 is a one-shot photo comic published as an experiment to create a "lost episode" of Star Trek using the photo comic concept. The annual was reprinted as Strange New Worlds, and later collected in New Visions, Vol. 1.

Stellar Cartography (2013) 

Stellar Cartography: The Starfleet Reference Library (2013) is a box set of maps and charts which expand on Star Trek Maps (1980) and Star Charts (2003). Produced and written by Larry Nemecek, with art by Allie Ries, Ian Fullwood, and Geoffrey Mandel. A revised edition, with new material, was published in 2018.

Hachette Book Group (2014–2017) 
Works published or distributed by Hachette Book Group.

Insight Editions (2016–2020) 

Licensed works commissioned by boutique publisher Insight Editions. Hidden Universe Travel Guides is an ongoing series of illustrated in-universe references, edited by Dayton Ward, who also wrote new material. The fighting style created by Dayton Ward for Kirk Fu Manual (2020) is depicted in several episodes of Star Trek: Lower Decks.

Star Trek Cats (2017–18) 

Star Trek Cats is a series of picture books which depict the crews of the Enterprise as house cats. Written by Jenny Parks. Published by Chronicle Books.

Star Trek Adventures (2018–2020) 
Star Trek Adventures is a tabletop role-playing game based on a variation of the d20 System. Published by Modiphius Entertainment. Variants were available in PDF and ebook formats as early as 2016.

Unlicensed works 
Below is an incomplete list of notable unlicensed works:

Best of Trek (1978–1997) 

The Best of Trek: From the Magazine for Star Trek Fans is a multi-volume collection of essays, articles, and reviews originally published in the fan magazine Trek. A significant number of the collected articles and essays were written with an in-universe perspective. Published by Signet, and later Roc, under the New American Library label. The series was published exclusively for the North American market due to rights issues.

Best of the Best of Trek (1990–1997) 

The Best of the Best of Trek collects selections from the Best of... series. Revised editions were published in 1997. Due to rights issues, variants of different lengths were published for markets outside of North America.

The Doctor and the Enterprise (1981) 
The Doctor and the Enterprise is an unlicensed novella written by Jean Airey, a columnist for Fantasy Empire and Starlog. The novella is based on characters and settings from Doctor Who, Star Trek, and Marion Zimmer Bradley Darkover. It was first published in the 1981 issue of fanzine R&R. Fanzines Zeta Minor and Enterprise reprinted the novella in various formats from 1982 to 1984. Paperback editions were published by New Media Books in 1985. In 1989, a redacted version of the novella, marketed as a parody, was published professionally by Pioneer Press in which nearly all direct references to Kirk, Spock, and other Star Trek characters were removed.

Star Wreck (1992–1994) 

Star Wreck is a series of unlicensed parody novels written by Leah Rewolinski, with illustrations by Harry Trumbore. Published by St. Martin's Press.

Treks Not Taken (1996–1998) 
Treks Not Taken (1996) is a short story collection by Steven R. Boyett presented as "What if … literary greats had written episodes" of The Next Generation. Boyett parodied the style of several popular writers. Originally published as a limited edition by Sneaker Press in 1996. Later reprinted by HarperCollins in 1998.

Unpublished works 
Below is an incomplete list of unpublished tie-in fiction works:

Notes

Similarly named works

References

External links 
  (Simon & Schuster)